Andrew Knyazev is an American mathematician. He graduated from the Faculty of Computational Mathematics and Cybernetics of Moscow State University under the supervision of Evgenii Georgievich D'yakonov in 1981 and obtained his PhD in Numerical Mathematics at the Russian Academy of Sciences under the supervision of Vyacheslav Ivanovich Lebedev in 1985. He worked at the Kurchatov Institute between 1981–1983, and then to 1992 at the Marchuk Institute of Numerical Mathematics of the Russian Academy of Sciences, headed by Gury Marchuk.

From 1993–1994, Knyazev held a visiting position at the Courant Institute of Mathematical Sciences of New York University, collaborating with Olof B. Widlund. From 1994 until retirement in 2014, he was a Professor of Mathematics at the University of Colorado Denver, supported by the National Science Foundation and United States Department of Energy grants. He was a recipient of the 2008 Excellence in Research Award, the 2000 college Teaching Excellence Award, and a finalist of the CU President's Faculty Excellence Award for Advancing Teaching and Learning through Technology in 1999. 
He was awarded the title of Professor Emeritus at the University of Colorado Denver 
and named the SIAM Fellow Class of 2016
and 
AMS Fellow Class of 2019.

From 2012–2018, Knyazev worked at the Mitsubishi Electric Research Laboratories  on algorithms for image and video processing, data sciences, optimal control, and material sciences, resulting in dozens of publications and 13 patent applications. Since 2018, he contributed to numerical techniques in quantum computing at Zapata Computing, real-time embedded anomaly detection in automotive data, and silicon photonics-based artificial intelligence and deep learning at Lightelligence.

Knyazev is mostly known for his work in numerical solution of large sparse eigenvalue problems, particularly preconditioning and the iterative method LOBPCG. Knyazev's reference implementation of LOBPCG is available in the public software package BLOPEX and, e.g., the electronic structure calculations library ABINIT for wavefunction parallel optimization.

Knyazev collaborated with John Osborn

on the theory of the Ritz method in the finite element method context 
and with Nikolai Sergeevich Bakhvalov (Erdős number 3 via Leonid Kantorovich) on numerical solution of elliptic partial differential equations with large jumps in the main coefficients.
Jointly with his Ph.D. students, Knyazev pioneered using majorization for bounds in the Rayleigh–Ritz method
(see and references there) and contributed to the theory of angles between flats.

References

External links

Patents granted to Andrei Kniazev and patent applications filed by Andrei Kniazev at USPTO and  world-wide
MathSciNet (subscription required) reviews for Andrew Knyazev 
Zentralblatt MATH (subscription required) reviews 
arXiv Reports
SIGPORT Contributions
Block Locally Optimal Preconditioned Eigenvalue Xolvers (BLOPEX) at GitHub
Knyazev's software in MATLAB

Andrew Knyazev on ResearchGate

20th-century American mathematicians
21st-century American mathematicians
Russian mathematicians
Soviet mathematicians
Moscow State University alumni
1959 births
Living people
University of Colorado Denver faculty
Applied mathematicians
Numerical analysts
Machine learning researchers
Senior Members of the IEEE
Fellows of the Society for Industrial and Applied Mathematics
Mitsubishi Electric people
Fellows of the American Mathematical Society